Schlieben is the name of an old German noble family, who can trace it's ancestry back to 1144 in Niederlausitz. They held the title of Count in Prussia and were also part of the nobility of Saxony.

Notable members 
 Eleonore von Schlieben (1720–1755), German noblewoman and a lady in waiting to Elisabeth Christine of Brunswick-Wolfenbüttel-Bevern
 Karl-Wilhelm von Schlieben (1894–1964), German general in the Wehrmacht during World War II

References

German-language surnames